Niquía is the first station on the Medellín Metro from north to south on line A. It is located in Bello, the second most populous city in the metropolitan area, after Medellín. The station was opened on 30 November 1995 as part of the inaugural section of line A, from Niquía to Poblado. 

The station also came to be an urban center in the middle of a region traditionally consisting of working and peasant families who saw the need to move to the central area of Medellín for any type of work. The station is now a true urban center with almost all necessary things for shopping and meetings. From there you can also access other districts of the city of Bello easily.

References

External links
 Official site of Medellín Metro 

Medellín Metro stations
Railway stations opened in 1995
1995 establishments in Colombia